Sokol is a rural locality (a settlement) in Bogolyubovskoye Rural Settlement, Suzdalsky District, Vladimir Oblast, Russia. The population was 1,486 as of 2010. There are 8 streets.

Geography 
Sokol is located on the Nerl River, 43 km southeast of Suzdal (the district's administrative centre) by road. Dobrynskoye is the nearest rural locality.

References 

Rural localities in Suzdalsky District